Pine Lake is a private, all-sports, 395-acre lake in West Bloomfield Township, Oakland County, in the U.S. state of Michigan.

The Pine Lake shoreline is lined with high-end exclusive homes.

In addition to Pine Lake Marina, Pine Lake Country Club is also located on the lake.

The  lake is the sixth-deepest lake in Oakland County. The ten deepest lakes in Oakland County are:
1.  Cass Lake (Waterford Twp. and West Bloomfield Twp.) 123 feet
2.  Maceday Lake (Waterford Twp.) 117 feet
3t.  Orchard Lake (West Bloomfield Twp.) 110 feet
3t.  Union Lake (Commerce Twp.) 110 feet
5.  Walnut Lake (West Bloomfield Twp.) 101 feet
6t.  Van Norman Lake (Independence Twp. and Waterford Twp.) 90 feet
6t.  Pine Lake (West Bloomfield Twp.) 90 feet
8.  Lake Angelus (Auburn Hills) 88 feet
9t. Loon Lake (Waterford Twp.) 73 feet
9t. Silver Lake (Waterford Twp.) 73 feet

References

Lakes of Oakland County, Michigan
Lakes of Michigan